The Saskatoon Blazers is a U18AAA ice hockey team from Saskatoon, Saskatchewan, Canada. They are a member of the Saskatchewan Male U18 AAA Hockey League. They played their home games at the Agri-Twin Arena, but have since switched to playing at the Rod Hamm Memorial Arena.

Notable alumni
Colby Armstrong
Lane Pederson
Jarret Stoll
Rhett Warrener
Braden Holtby
Curtis Leschyshyn
Jake Leschyshyn
Kevin Kaminski

External links
 http://www.saskatoonblazers.ca/

Ice hockey teams in Saskatchewan